(born December 8, 1943) is a Japanese former professional baseball outfielder in Nippon Professional Baseball. He played for the Kintetsu Buffaloes from 1962 to 1974 and the Taiheiyo Club / Crown Lighter / Seibu Lions from 1975 to 1981. Despite a stellar 20-year career as a slugger (including 15 All-Star team selections), Doi never made it to the postseason or got a chance to play in the Japan Series.

He last served as the batting coach for the Chunichi Dragons.

Career 
Born in Kashiwara, Osaka, Doi attended Daitetsu High School, dropping out before graduation.

Doi led the Pacific League in hits in 1964 and 1967 with 168 and 147 respectively. He was a 1968 Best Nine Award-winner as an outfielder.

Doi was a bit player in the Black Mist Scandal, which embroiled NPB from 1969–1971. In July 1970 Doi was prosecuted for illegal gambling. He was later suspended by the league for a month.

The following season was the best of Doi's career, as he hit .309 with 40 home runs, 113 RBI, and a .998 OPS.

In 1975, his first season with the Lions, Doi led the Pacific League in home runs, with 34.

Doi finished his career among the all-time NPB leaders with 465 home runs (11th all-time) and 1,400 RBI (12th all-time). With more than 2,000 career hits, he became a member of the Meikyukai, or the Golden Players Club.

After retiring from playing, he became a coach with the Lions.

References

1943 births
Living people
People from Kashiwara, Osaka
Japanese baseball players
Nippon Professional Baseball outfielders
Kintetsu Buffaloes players
Taiheiyo Club Lions players
Crown Lighter Lions players
Seibu Lions players
Nippon Professional Baseball coaches
Japanese baseball coaches